Berthar (Bertarius, Bercharius or Bercarius) is a masculine Germanic given name meaning "glorious warrior". The name Charibert has the same meaning, combining the same two roots in reverse order. In its variant spellings, it may refer to:

Bertachar, king of Thuringia (520s–530s)
Berthar, Transjuran Frank who fought in the Battle of Autun (640s)
Bercharius of Montier-en-Der, founder and first abbot (666)
Bercharius of Hautvillers (d. 685), abbot
Berchar, mayor of the palace of Neustria and Burgundy (686–687)
Bertarius of Verdun (fl. c. 857), priest and author
Bertharius of Monte Cassino, abbot (856–883)

References